Don Reynolds (May 29, 1937 – January 9, 2019) was an American child actor and later an animal trainer.

Born on May 29, 1937, in Odell, Texas, he began his film career with a small part in The Yellow Rose of Texas in 1944. He is most known for playing a Native American boy, "Little Beaver", in four pictures between 1948 and 1951. He was often billed as Little Brown Jug. After appearing in an episode of The Adventures of Kit Carson in 1951, he ended his professional acting career.

In later life, Reynolds trained animals in movies such as The Lord of the Rings: The Fellowship of the Ring and Santa Claus: The Movie. He starred as (Doc Brown) in the western TV web series Sundown.

In 1960, Reynolds married Cynthia Kieschnick.

In 2015, Reynolds was inducted into the Texas Rodeo Cowboy Hall of Fame.

Filmography

References

External links
 
 

1937 births
2019 deaths
American male child actors
20th-century American male actors
American male film actors
Male Western (genre) film actors
Western (genre) television actors